Christian Holzenberg (2 January 1910 – 27 February 1942) was a German sprint canoeist who competed in the late 1930s. He won a bronze medal in the C-2 10000 m event at the 1938 ICF Canoe Sprint World Championships in Vaxholm. Holzengerg also finished fourth in the C-2 10000 m event at the 1936 Summer Olympics in Berlin.

He was killed in action during World War II.

References

Sources

Christian Holzenberg's profile at Sports Reference.com

1910 births
1942 deaths
Canoeists at the 1936 Summer Olympics
German male canoeists
Olympic canoeists of Germany
ICF Canoe Sprint World Championships medalists in Canadian
German military personnel killed in World War II